EnergyCAP is a family of energy management and energy accounting software products and services, used for processing, tracking, processing, reporting, benchmarking, and analyzing utility bills and comprehensive energy and sustainability management and reporting. EnergyCAP also interfaces with the EPA Energy Star Portfolio Manager. Multiple versions of EnergyCAP—Enterprise, Express, Consultant Platform, and Professional—are available to meet user functional requirements. The EnergyCAP solution is SOC 2 Type 2 certified, and a FedRAMP-authorized data hosting service is available to federal agencies.

History 

EnergyCAP's history dates back to 1980. In response to a growing demand for energy management software when PCs were in their infancy, Steven D. Heinz founded OmniComp, Inc. in 1980 and launched the development of EnergyCAP predecessor FASER Energy Accounting.

FASER became widely used by retail chains, government, universities, school districts and property managers. By the mid-1990s, FASER's thousands of users tracked an estimated five million bills a year valued at $2 billion. FASER and OmniComp were purchased by Enron Corporation in 1996. Following Enron's bankruptcy in late 2001, Heinz acquired the energy information assets and launched Good Steward Software, which was renamed to EnergyCAP, Inc. in January 2010. The company was renamed EnergyCAP, LLC in March 2021 upon the establishment of a strategic partnership with private equity investment firm Resurgens Technology Partners.

Software Versions 

EnergyCAP Enterprise is software for large organizations with comprehensive energy information management needs. Users include Fortune 1,000 companies; universities; military; and city, county, and state governments. EnergyCAP Express is utility bill and energy management software for small to medium-sized organizations like colleges, towns, and small- to medium-sized businesses. EnergyCAP Consultant Platform (CP and CP Plus) is offered to energy service companies (ESCOs) and consulting firms that use EnergyCAP to manage client energy data. EnergyCAP Professional is oriented toward measurement and verification of energy savings for certain qualifying organizations, most notably school districts.

References

External links
EnergyCAP Official Website
U.S. Dept of Energy's Building Technologies Program
Efficiency Valuation Organization
Colorado Governor Mandates EnergyCAP for Sustainability Reporting
Energy Education Uses EnergyCAP for Savings Verification
EnergyCAP Listed for Third Year in Inc. 5000

Business software